This article contains a list of Hymenoptera Apocrita of Ireland.

Superfamily Chrysidoidea

Family Dryinidae 

 Anteon arcuatum  Kieffer 1905
 Anteon brachycerum  (Dalman 1823)
 Anteon ephippiger  (Dalman 1818)
 Anteon flavicorne  (Dalman 1818)
 Anteon fulviventre  (Haliday 1828)
 Anteon gaullei  Kieffer 1905
 Anteon infectum  (Haliday 1837)
 Anteon jurineanum  Latreille 1809
 Anteon pubicorne  (Dalman 1818)
 Anteon tripartitum  (Kieffer 1905)
 Aphelopus atratus  (Dalman 1823)
 Aphelopus melaleucus  (Dalman 1818)
 Aphelopus nigriceps  Kieffer 1905
 Aphelopus serratus  Richards 1939
 Gonatopus bicolor  (Haliday 1828)
 Gonatopus clavipes  (Thunberg 1827)
 Gonatopus distinguendus  Kieffer 1905
 Gonatopus striatus  Kieffer 1905
 Lonchodryinus ruficornis  (Dalman 1818)

Family Bethylidae 

 Bethylus fuscicornis  (Jurine 1807)
 Cephalonomia waterstoni  Gahan 1931

Family Chrysididae (cuckoo wasps)
Pseudomalus auratus (Linnaeus, 1758)
Chrysis mediata Linsenmaier, 1951
Chrysis ignita Linnaeus, 1758
Chrysis rutiliventris Abeille de Perrin, 1879

Superfamily Vespoidea

Family Tiphiidae (tiphiid wasps)

 Tiphia minuta Linden 1827

Family Mutillidae (velvet ants)
Myrmosa atra Panzer, 1801

Family Formicidae (ants)
Formica aquilonia Yarrow, 1955
Formica lugubris Zetterstedt 1838
Formica fusca Linnaeus 1758
Formica lemani Bondroit 1917
Hypoponera punctatissima (Roger 1859)
Lasius flavus (Fabricius 1782)
Lasius mixtus (Nylander 1846)
Lasius umbratus (Nylander 1946)
Lasius fuliginosus (Latreille 1798)
Lasius alienus (Foerster 1850)
Lasius niger (Linnaeus 1758)
Lasius platythorax Seifert, 1991
Leptothorax acervorum (Fabricius 1793)
Monomorium pharaonis (Linnaeus 1758)
Myrmica lobicornis Nylander 1846
Myrmica rubra (Linnaeus 1758)
Myrmica ruginodis  Nylander 1846
Myrmica sabuleti Meinert 1861
Myrmica scabrinodis Nylander 1846
Myrmica schencki Emery 1895
Myrmica sulcinodis Nylander 1846
Stenamma debile (Forster 1850)
Stenamma westwoodi Westwood 1839
Tetramorium caespitum (Linnaeus 1758)
Tetramorium lucayanum Wheeler 1905

Family Pompilidae (spider wasps)

Sub-family Ceropalinae

Genus Ceropales
Ceropales maculata  (Fabricius, 1775)

Sub-family Pepsinae

Genus Dipogon
Dipogon variegatus (Linnaeus, 1758) Historic records

Genus Priocnemis
Priocnemis perturbator (Harris, 1780)

Sub-family Pompilinae

Genus Anoplius
Anoplius nigerrimus  (Scopoli, 1763)

Genus Episyron
Episyron rufipes (Linnaeus, 1758)

Genus Evagetes
Evagetes crassicornis (Shuckard, 1835)

Genus Pompilus
Pompilus cinereus (Fabricius, 1775)

Family Vespidae

Subfamily Eumeninae (potter and mason wasps)

Genus Odynerus

Subgenus Odynerus
Odynerus spinipes (Linnaeus, 1758) Historic records

Genus Ancistrocerus 
Ancistrocerus antilope (Panzer 1798) 
Ancistrocerus gazella (Panzer 1798) 
Ancistrocerus nigricornis (Curtis 1826) 
Ancistrocerus oviventris (Wesmael 1836) 
Ancistrocerus parietinus (Linnaeus 1761) 
Ancistrocerus scoticus (Curtis 1826) 
Ancistrocerus trifasciatus (Muller 1776)

Genus Symmorphus 
Symmorphus bifasciatus (Linnaeus 1761)

Subfamily Vespinae (social wasps)

Genus Dolichovespula 
Dolichovespula norwegica (Fabricius, 1781)
Dolichovespula saxonica  (Fabricius, 1793)

Subgenus Pseudovespula 
 Dolichovespula sylvestris  (Scopoli, 1763)

Genus Vespula (typical social wasps)

Subgenus Vespula 
Vespula austriaca  (Panzer, 1799) 
Vespula rufa (Linnaeus, 1758)

Subgenus Paravespula 
Vespula germanica (Fabricius, 1793) 
Vespula vulgaris (Linnaeus, 1758)

Family Sphecidae

Genus Ammophila

Ammophila sabulosa  (Linnaeus 1758)

Genus Podalonia

Podalonia affinis  (W. Kirby 1798) 
Podalonia hirsuta (Scopoli 1763)

Family Crabronidae

Genus Argogorytes

Argogorytes mystaceus (Linnaeus 1761)

Genus Astata

Astata boops (Schrank 1781)

Genus Crabro

Crabro peltarius (Schreber 1784)

Genus Crossocerus

Crossocerus capitosus (Shuckard 1837)
Crossocerus cetratus (Shuckard 1837)
Crossocerus dimidiatus (Fabricius 1781)
Crossocerus elongatulus (Vander Linden 1829)
Crossocerus exiguus (Vander Linden 1829)
Crossocerus megacephalus (Rossi 1790)
Crossocerus nigritus (Lepeletier & Brullé 1835)
Crossocerus palmipes (Linnaeus 1767)
Crossocerus podagricus (Vander Linden 1829)
Crossocerus quadrimaculatus (Fabricius 1793)
Crossocerus styrius (Kohl 1892)
Crossocerus tarsatus (Shuckard 1837)
Crossocerus varus Lepeletier & Brullé 1835
Crossocerus walkeri (Shuckard 1837)
Crossocerus wesmaeli (Vander Linden 1829)

Genus Ectemnius

Ectemnius cavifrons (Thomson 1870)
Ectemnius cephalotes (Olivier 1792)
Ectemnius continuus (Fabricius 1804)
Ectemnius lapidarius (Panzer 1804)
Ectemnius ruficornis (Zetterstedt 1838)

Genus Lindenius

Lindenius albilabris  (Fabricius 1793)

Genus Mellinus

Mellinus arvensis (Linnaeus 1758)

Genus Mimumesa

Mimumesa littoralis  (Bondroit 1934)
Mimumesa unicolor  (Vander Linden 1829)

Genus Nysson

Nysson spinosus  (J. Forster 1771)

Genus Oxybelus

Oxybelus uniglumis  (Linnaeus 1758)

Genus Passaloecus

Passaloecus insignis  (Vander Linden 1829)
Passaloecus monilicornis  Dahlbom 1842

Genus Pemphredon

Pemphredon inornata  Say 1824
Pemphredon lethifer  (Shuckard 1837)
Pemphredon lugubris  (Fabricius 1793)
Pemphredon rugifer (Dahlbom 1844)

Genus Psenulus

Psenulus pallipes  (Panzer 1798)

Genus Rhopalum

Rhopalum clavipes  (Linnaeus 1758)
Rhopalum coarctatum  (Scopoli 1763)

Genus Spilomena

Spilomena troglodytes  (Vander Linden 1829)

Genus Tachysphex

Tachysphex pompiliformis  (Panzer 1805)

Genus Trypoxylon

Trypoxylon attenuatum  F. Smith 1851
Trypoxylon clavicerum  Lepeletier & Serville 1828

Superfamily Apoidea

Family Colletidae

Genus Colletes (plasterer bees) 
 Colletes daviesanus Smith, 1846
 Colletes floralis  Eversmann, 1852
 Colletes fodiens (Geoffroy, 1785)
 Colletes similis Schenk, 1853
 Colletes succinctus (Linnaeus, 1758)

Genus Hylaeus 
 Hylaeus brevicornis Nylander, 1852
 Hylaeus communis  Nylander, 1852
 Hylaeus confusus  Nylander, 1852
 Hylaeus hyalinatus Smith, 1842

Family Andrenidae (mining bees)

Genus Andrena (mining bee) 
 Andrena angustior (Kirby, 1802)
 Andrena apicata Smith, 1847
 Andrena barbilabris (Kirby, 1802)
 Andrena bicolor Fabricius, 1775
 Andrena carantonica Perez, 1902
 Andrena cineraria (Linnaeus, 1758)
 Andrena clarkella (Kirby, 1802)
 Andrena coitana (Kirby, 1802)
 Andrena denticulata (Kirby, 1802)
 Andrena fucata Smith, 1847
 Andrena fulva (Müller, 1766)
 Andrena fuscipes (Kirby, 1802)
 Andrena haemorrhoa (Fabricius, 1781)
 Andrena hattorfiana (Fabricius, 1775)
 Andrena helvola (Linnaeus, 1758)
 Andrena humilis Imhoff, 1832
 Andrena lapponica Zetterstedt, 1838
 Andrena marginata  Fabricius, 1777
 Andrena minutula (Kirby, 1802)
 Andrena nigroaenea (Kirby, 1802)
 Andrena ovatula (Kirby, 1802)
 Andrena pilipes s.s. Fabricius, 1781
 Andrena praecox (Scopoli, 1763)
 Andrena rosae Panzer, 1801
 Andrena semilaevis  Perez, 1903
 Andrena stragulata Illiger, 1806
 Andrena subopaca Nylander, 1848
 Andrena tarsata Nylander, 1848
 Andrena trimmerana (Kirby, 1802)
 Andrena wilkella (Kirby, 1802)

Family Halictidae (sweat bees)

Genus Halictus 
 Halictus rubicundus (Christ, 1791)
 Halictus tumulorum (Linnaeus, 1758)

Genus Lasioglossum 
 Lasioglossum albipes (Fabricius, 1781)
 Lasioglossum calceatum (Scopoli, 1763)
 Lasioglossum cupromicans  (Pérez, 1903)
 Lasioglossum fratellum  (Pérez, 1903)
 Lasioglossum lativentre (Schenck, 1853)
 Lasioglossum leucopus (Kirby, 1802)
 Lasioglossum nitidiusculum (Kirby, 1802)
 Lasioglossum punctatissimum  (Schenck, 1853)
 Lasioglossum rufitarse (Zetterstedt, 1838)
 Lasioglossum smeathmanellum (Kirby, 1802)
 Lasioglossum villosulum (Kirby, 1802)

Genus Sphecodes 
 Sphecodes crassus Thomson, 1870
 Sphecodes ephippius  (Linnaeus, 1767)
 Sphecodes ferruginatus von Hagens, 1882
 Sphecodes geoffrellus (Kirby, 1802)
 Sphecodes gibbus (Linnaeus 1785)
 Sphecodes hyalinatus von Hagens, 1882
 Sphecodes monilicornis (Kirby, 1802)
 Sphecodes pellucidus  Smith, F., 1845

Family Megachilidae

Genus Osmia (mason bee)
 Osmia aurulenta (Panzer, 1799)
 Osmia rufa (Linnaeus, 1758)

Genus Megachile (leafcutter bees)
 Megachile centuncularis Linnaeus 1758
 Megachile circumcincta Kirby 1802
 Megachile ligniseca Kirby 1802
 Megachile maritima  Kirby 1802
 Megachile versicolor Smith 1844
 Megachile willughbiella Kirby 1802

Genus Coelioxys (leaf-cutting cuckoo bees, sharp-tailed bees)
 Coelioxys elongata Lepeletier, 1841
 Coelioxys inermis Kirby, 1802

Family Apidae

Genus Nomada 
 Nomada argentata Herrich-Schäffer, 1839
 Nomada fabriciana (Linnaeus, 1767)
 Nomada flavoguttata  (Kirby, 1802)
 Nomada goodeniana (Kirby, 1802)
 Nomada leucophthalma (Kirby, 1802)
 Nomada marshamella (Kirby, 1802)
 Nomada obtusifrons  Nylander, 1848
 Nomada panzeri Lepeletier, 1841
 Nomada ruficornis (Linnaeus, 1758)
 Nomada rufipes Fabricius, 1793
 Nomada sheppardana  (Kirby, 1802)
 Nomada striata Fabricius, 1793

Genus Bombus (bumblebees)

Subgenus Bombus 
 Bombus cryptarum (Fabricius, 1775)
 Bombus lucorum Linnaeus, 1761
 Bombus terrestris  (Linnaeus, 1758)
 Bombus magnus  Vogt, 1911

Subgenus Megabombus 
 Bombus (Megabombus) hortorum Linnaeus, 1761

Subgenus Melanobombus 
 Bombus (Melanobombus) lapidarius (Linnaeus, 1758)

Subgenus Psithyrus 
 Bombus (Psithyrus) barbutellus (Kirby, 1802) 
 Bombus (Psithyrus) bohemicus Seidl, 1838
 Bombus (Psithyrus) campestris (Panzer, 1801)
 Bombus (Psithyrus) rupestris (Fabricius, 1793)
 Bombus (Psithyrus) sylvestris (Lepeletier, 1833)
 Bombus (Psithyrus) vestalis Geoffroy, 1785

Subgenus Pyrobombus 
 Bombus (Pyrobombus) jonellus  	(Kirby, 1802)
 Bombus (Pyrobombus) monticola  Smith, 1849
 Bombus (Pyrobombus) pratorum (Linnaeus, 1761)
 Bombus (Pyrobombus) hypnorum Linnaeus, 1758

Subgenus Subterraneobombus 
 Bobus (Subterraneobombus) distinguendus Morawitz, 1869

Subgenus Thoracombus 
 Bombus (Thoracombus) muscorum (Linnaeus, 1758)
 Bombus (Thoracombus) pascuorum (Scopoli, 1763)
 Bombus (Thoracombus) ruderarius (Müller, 1776)
 Bombus (Thoracombus) sylvarum (Linnaeus, 1761)

Genus Apis (honey bees) 
 Apis mellifera, western honey bee (Linnaeus, 1758)

References

 Else, George "Section 10 - Check List of British Hymenoptera Aculeata" in Archer, Michael (2005) Bees, Wasps and Ants Recording Society Members' Handbook 
George R. Else, Barry Bolton, and Gavin R. Broad Checklist of British and Irish Hymenoptera - aculeates (Apoidea, Chrysidoidea and Vespoidea) Biodivers Data J. 2016; (4): e8050. doi:  10.3897/BDJ.4.e8050
Nelson, B., Ronayne, C., Nash, R. and O’Connor, J.P. 2002. Additions and changes to the Irish aculeate Hymenoptera checklist. Irish Naturalists’ Journal 26: 453-459.

External links
 Antwiki

Hymenoptera